The Hampshire Tennis Championships  or the Hampshire Championships was a men's and women's grass court tennis event established in 1878 as the Bournemouth CLTC Tournament. In 1906 the Bournemouth tournament was upgraded to a county level event and renamed as Hampshire County Lawn Tennis Championships that ran continuously until 1981.

History
On May 21, 1878 the Bournemouth Cricket and Lawn Tennis Club staged its first tennis spring meeting the Bournemouth CLTC Tournament held at the cricket ground Dean Park, Bournemouth, Dorset, England that concluded on May 24, 1878. In October 1878 a second autumn meeting was also held at the same venue.

In 1891 the Bournemouth LTC Tournament became known as the Bournemouth Open Tournament. In 1906 the Bournemouth Open Tournament as it was called, was upgraded to a county level event and renamed as the Hampshire Lawn Tennis Championships, that ran continuously until 1981 when it ceased to be part of the international tennis tour.

This tournament is still being staged today as a merged event called the Hampshire & IOW County Championships.

Event names
 Bournemouth Cricket and Lawn Tennis Club Tournament (1878–1882)
 Bournemouth Lawn Tennis Club Tournament (1883–1891)
 Bournemouth Open Tournament (1891–1905)
 Hampshire County Lawn Tennis Championship (1906–1910)
 Hampshire Lawn Tennis Championships (1911–1960)
 Hampshire Championships (1960–1971)
 Hampshire Tennis Championships (1972–1981)

References

Defunct tennis tournaments in the United Kingdom
Grass court tennis tournaments